How Booze Built America is an American reality-documentary miniseries starring Mike Rowe. The miniseries premiered on the Discovery Channel on September 19, 2012. In each episode, Rowe travels around the United States discussing how alcoholic beverages affected periods throughout American history.

Episodes

References

External links
Official website

2012 American television series debuts
2010s American reality television series
2012 American television series endings
2010s American documentary television series
English-language television shows
American educational television series
Discovery Channel original programming